Anthony G. "Tony" Chavonne is an American politician, accountant and realtor. He served as the Mayor of Fayetteville, North Carolina, for four consecutive, two-year terms from 2005 until 2013. First elected in 2005, Chavonne ran unopposed in 2007. He again won re-election in 2009 and 2011. In 2013, Chavonne announced that he would not seek re-election after eight years in office.

During his tenure as mayor, the city's population expanded from 150,000 people to over 200,000 people. Among other innovations in the city during his tenure is the adoption of curb-side recycling.

Chavonne is a realtor and accountant. He was general manager of Fayetteville Publishing Company until he retired in 2004. He is an alumnus of the University of North Carolina at Chapel Hill.

References

Sources
Fayetteville City bio of Chavonne
Project Vote Smart entry for Chavonne
May 30, 2012 Fayetteville Observer article with detailed mention of Chavonne being mayor
"Fayetteville Observer" article from April 2013

Living people
Mayors of Fayetteville, North Carolina
American accountants
University of North Carolina at Chapel Hill alumni
Year of birth missing (living people)